Kutak or Kootak, also rendered as Kuh Tak, may refer to:
 Kutak, Hajjiabad, Hormozgan Province
 Kutak, Jask, Hormozgan Province
 Kutak-e Qalat, Hormozgan Province
 Kutak-e Rayisi, Hormozgan Province
 Kutak-e Bala Shomareh-ye Yek, Kerman Province
 Kutak-e Pain, Kerman Province
 Kutak-e Vasat, Kerman Province
 Kutak-e Jajji Aqa, Khuzestan Province
 Kutak-e Mohammad Karim, Khuzestan Province